Bruno Zwintscher (15 May 1838 – 4 March 1905) was a German piano educator.

Life 
Born in Ziegenhain near Nossen, Zwintscher attended the Dresdener Kreuzschule before he became a student of Louis Plaidy at the University of Music and Theatre Leipzig in 1856. From 1875 to 1896, Zwintscher himself worked as a piano teacher at this conservatory. His students there included Anna Diller Starbuck. Afterwards he worked as a private teacher in Dresden. His Klavier-Technik is an extension of Plaidy's work. He also published Musikalische Verzierungen.

Otto, born from Zwintscher's marriage to Frieda, had three sons: the philologist Arthur (1867–1937), the painter Oskar (1870–1916) and the pianist Rudolf (1871–1946).

Zwintscher died in  near Radebeul at the age of 64.

 Work 
 Klavier-Technik, 7 Hefte, Leipzig ohne Jahresangabe (published in English by C.H. Porter as Technical Exercises Systematically).
 Musikalische Verzierungen: Praktische Übungen und theoretische Erläuterungen nebst einen Anhang über den Metronom. Leipzig 1895.
 Clavier-Technik systematisch geordnet zum Gebrauch bei seinem Unterricht''. (1900)

Literatur

References

External links 
 
 

1838 births
1905 deaths
People from Saxony
German music educators